The 2010–11 Portland Pilots men's basketball team represented University of Portland in the 2010–11 NCAA Division I men's basketball season. The Pilots were members of the West Coast Conference and were led by fifth-year head coach Eric Reveno. They played their home games at the Chiles Center. They finished the season with 20–12, 7–7 in WCC play and lost the first round in the 2011 West Coast Conference men's basketball tournament to Loyola Marymount. They were invited to the 2011 CollegeInsider.com Tournament which they lost to Hawaii in the first round.

Roster

2010–11 Schedule and results

|-
!colspan=9 style=| Exhibition

|-
!colspan=9 style=| Regular season

|-
!colspan=9 style=| WCC tournament

|-
!colspan=9 style=| CollegeInsider.com tournament

|-

References

Portland
Portland
Portland Pilots men's basketball seasons
Portland Pilots men's basketball
Portland Pilots men's basketball
Port
Port